Gireum Station is an underground station of the Seoul Subway Line 4 in Gireum-dong, Seongbuk-gu, Seoul, South Korea. Jeongneung tomb lies nearby.

Station layout

Neighborhood 
 Seoul Jongam Police Station

References 

Seoul Metropolitan Subway stations
Metro stations in Seongbuk District
Railway stations in South Korea opened in 1985